The Bombing of Xàtiva was an aerial bombing of the railway station of Xàtiva, Valencia Province, during the last phase of the Spanish Civil War. It was carried out on 12 February 1939 at the behest of Francisco Franco's nationalist government by the Aviazione Legionaria of its Fascist Italian allies.

History
Carried out in the last days of the Civil War, the bombing hit a train which had entered Xàtiva Railway Station in the morning. 129 people died, of whom 109 perished instantly, and over 200 were wounded.

The train was carrying military personnel of the Spanish Republican Army belonging to the 49th Mixed Brigade, which was being transferred to another location. At the time of the bombing the train was surrounded by a throng of civilians who hoped to greet relatives and friends among the soldiers. Most of those who perished were members of the 49th Mixed Brigade.

The bombing was carried out around 10:30 am by five Savoia-Marchetti SM.79 bombers of the Aviazione Legionaria based in Palma de Mallorca. Although the fatalities were mostly soldiers, some of the victims were civilians, including three children and 14 women. There were so many dead and wounded among the members of the 49th Mixed Brigade, that the Republican high command desisted from reconstituting it, distributing the survivors among other military units.

See also
Aviazione Legionaria

References

External links
 Images of the bombing of Xàtiva .
 Hace 60 años que las bombas cayeron sobre Xàtiva

1939 in Spain
Explosions in 1939
Xàtiva
Spanish Civil War massacres
Conflicts in 1939
Airstrikes during the Spanish Civil War
February 1939 events
Airstrikes conducted by Italy
Italian war crimes